SC4 may refer to:

 Au Cap (ISO 3166-2:SC code SC-04), an administrative district of Seychelles located on the island of Mahé
 , an SC-1-class submarine chaser built for the United States Navy during World War I
 SC04, a FIPS code for Saint George Gingerland Parish, Saint Kitts and Nevis
 SC4, an uncultivated bacterial phylum
 SimCity 4, a 2003 city-building computer game
 South Carolina Highway 4, a 54.2-mile-long (87.2 km) state highway in the southern part of the U.S. state of South Carolina
 South Carolina's 4th congressional district, a congressional district in upstate South Carolina bordering North Carolina
 St. Clair County Community College, a two-year community college located in Port Huron, Michigan
 Super Castlevania IV, a 1991 video game